WCNA (95.9 FM, "Mix 95.9") is a radio station licensed to the community of Potts Camp, Mississippi, United States, and serving the Tupelo, Mississippi, area.  The station is owned by Stephen C. Davenport, through licensee Telesouth Communications Inc.

WCNA "Mix 95.9" airs a hot adult contemporary format. WCNA's signal can be heard from Bolivar, Tennessee, to Houston, Mississippi, and from Olive Branch, Mississippi, to Red Bay, Alabama.

The station was assigned the WCNA call letters by the Federal Communications Commission on February 17, 1995.

In June 2019, WCNA changed their format from talk to hot adult contemporary, branded as "Mix 95.9".

References

External links
WCNA Website

CNA
Radio stations established in 1996
Marshall County, Mississippi
1996 establishments in Mississippi
Hot adult contemporary radio stations in the United States